Rui Pedro Ribeiro Fernandes Duarte Gomes (born 4 September 1997) is a Portuguese professional footballer who plays as a forward for Primeira Liga club Portimonense.

Football career
On 10 January 2016, Gomes made his professional debut with Vitória Guimarães B in a 2015–16 Segunda Liga match against Santa Clara. He played one match in the Ekstraklasa for Legia Warsaw in their 2021–22 season, on 22 January 2022 moved to Covilhã.

References

External links

Stats and profile at LPFP 

1997 births
Sportspeople from Braga
Living people
Portuguese footballers
Association football forwards
Portugal youth international footballers
Vitória S.C. B players
Legia Warsaw II players
Legia Warsaw players
S.C. Covilhã players
Portimonense S.C. players
Liga Portugal 2 players
Primeira Liga players
III liga players
Ekstraklasa players
Portuguese expatriate footballers
Expatriate footballers in Poland
Portuguese expatriate sportspeople in Poland